Madigan refers to:

People 
 Amy Madigan (born 1950), American actress
 Betty Madigan (born 1930), American popular singer
 Cecil Madigan (1889–1947), Australian explorer and geologist
 Charles Madigan (born 1949), American journalist and editor
 Colin Madigan (1921–2011), Australian architect
 Edward Rell Madigan (1936–1994), American politician from Illinois, congressman and Secretary of Agriculture
 Elvira Madigan (1867–1889), Danish ropedancer and trick rider, eponym of a film
 Frank Madigan (1908–1979), American law enforcement officer in the 1960s in California
 Josepha Madigan (born 1970), Irish Fine Gael politician
 Kathleen Madigan (born 1965), American television comedian
 Lisa Madigan (born 1966), American politician from Illinois, former Illinois state Attorney General, daughter of Michael Madigan
 Michael Madigan (born 1942), American politician from Illinois, former Speaker of the Illinois House of Representatives
 Robert Madigan (1942–2006), American politician from Illinois, Illinois State Senator
 Roger A. Madigan (1930-2018), American farmer, businessman, and politician from Pennsylvania
 Rosemary Madigan (1926–2019), Australian sculptor, stonecarver and woodcarver
 Slip Madigan (Edward Patrick Madigan) (1896–1966), American college football player at Notre Dame University

Other 
 Madigan Army Medical Center
 Madigan, a 1968 film starring Richard Widmark
 Madigan (TV series), a 1972 television series based on the 1968 film
 Madigan, a character from the 1975 film Coonskin
 Madigan's Millions, 1969 Italian-Spanish movie starring Dustin Hoffman
 Madigan Men, a 2000 television series
 Ben Madigan Preparatory School at the Belfast Royal Academy
 Edward R. Madigan State Fish and Wildlife Area in Illinois, USA